Bryoxena is a genus of moths of the family Noctuidae.

Species
 Bryoxena centralasiae (Staudinger, 1882)

References
 Bryoxena at Markku Savela's Lepidoptera and Some Other Life Forms
 Natural History Museum Lepidoptera genus database

Xyleninae